Lena Kristina Adler (born 24 October 1941) is a Swedish gymnast. She competed in the 1960 Summer Olympics.

References

1941 births
Living people
Gymnasts at the 1960 Summer Olympics
Swedish female artistic gymnasts
Olympic gymnasts of Sweden
Sportspeople from Gothenburg
20th-century Swedish women